The 2003–04 Scottish League Cup was the 58th staging of the Scotland's second most prestigious football knockout competition, also known for sponsorship reasons as the CIS Insurance Cup.

The competition was won by Livingston, who defeated Hibernian 2–0 in the final.

First round
Ties played on weekend of 2–3 September 2003
If scores were level at full-time, 30 minutes of extra time and penalties were played.

Second round
Ties played on 23–24 September 2003
If scores were level at full-time, 30 minutes of extra time and penalties were played.

Third round

Quarter-finals

Semi-finals

Final

Scottish League Cup seasons
League Cup